Marat Gainelyanovich Galimov (born 29 January 1964) is a Russian former professional football referee and a player.

Club career
As a player, he made his professional debut in the Soviet Second League in 1983 for FC Uralmash Sverdlovsk.

Referee career
He worked as a referee from 1996 to 2007, including nine games in the Russian Premier League in 2001 and 2003.

References

1984 births
Sportspeople from Yekaterinburg
Living people
Soviet footballers
Russian footballers
Association football defenders
FC Ural Yekaterinburg players
FC Kyzylzhar players
FC Okzhetpes players
FC Kairat players
FC Spartak Semey players
Russian Premier League players
Russian football referees